Tetramorium insolens is a species of ant in the genus Tetramorium. It is a medium-sized orange ant that is mainly seen on vegetation, has a monomorphic work caste with 12-segmented antennae, three-segmented antennal club, short antennal scapes that do not surpass the posterior margin of the head, a gradually sloped mesosoma, and strong propodeal spines. It has two waist segments and a gaster with a stinger.

The species lives primarily and natively in the Pacific Island region, with an invasive and non-native yet established presence recorded in Austria, Hungary, France, and the Netherlands.

References

External links

insolens
Insects described in 1861